The 1962–63 Kansas Jayhawks men's basketball team represented the University of Kansas during the 1962–63 college men's basketball season.

Roster
George Unseld
Nolen Ellison
Harry Gibson
Jim Dumas 
Dave Schichtle
Al Correll
John Matt
Kerry Bolton
Dave Brill
Loye Sparks
Jay Roberts
Robert Buddy Vance
Richard Ruggles
Jim Gough
Pete Townsend

Schedule

References

Kansas Jayhawks men's basketball seasons
Kansas
Kansas
Kansas